Neritilia rubida is a species of submarine cave snail, a marine gastropod mollusc in the family Neritiliidae.

Neritilia rubida is the type species of the genus Neritilia.

References

 Brandt, R. A. M. (1974). The non-marine aquatic Mollusca of Thailand. Archiv für Molluskenkunde. 105: i-iv, 1-423
 Cowie, R. H. (1998). Catalog of the nonmarine snails and slugs of the Samoan Islands. Bishop Museum Bulletins in Zoology. 3: 1-122

External links
 Kano, Y., & Kase, T. (2003). Systematics of the Neritilia rubida complex (Gastropoda: Neritiliidae): three amphidromous species with overlapping distributions in the Indo-Pacific. Journal of Molluscan Studies, 69(3), 273-284. 
 Pease W.H. (1865). Descriptions of new genera and species of marine shells from the islands of the Central Pacific. Proceedings of the Zoological Society of London. (1865): 512-517.
 Martens, E. von. (1863-1879). Die Gattung Neritina. In: Küster, H. C.; Kobelt, W., Weinkauff, H. C., Eds. Systematisches Conchylien-Cabinet von Martini und Chemnitz. Neu herausgegeben und vervollständigt. Zweiten Bandes zehnte Abtheilung. 1-303, pls A, 1-23. Nürnberg: Bauer & Raspe.

Neritiliidae
Gastropods described in 1865